Weaponry Listens to Love is an album by the English riot grrrl band Huggy Bear. It was released in 1994. The band broke up shortly after its release, due to their self-imposed three-year time frame.

Critical reception

Trouser Press thought that "Huggy Bear is a complete disaster, a stunningly dull band grinding away behind an incomprehensible sloganeer who won’t shut up." The Village Voice wrote that "like all bands who forged their spirit in the embrace of the amateur, on Weaponry they seem not to know what to do with their newfound expertise; Jo's guitarwork could unhinge the jaw of most metalhead boy musos, but also seems to have disarmed her bandmates." The Guardian opined that the album "is as enraged as the first, but lacks its touches of modulating whimsy."

AllMusic wrote that "the material here is less singsongy and obvious, opting for sludgier instrumentation and more male lead vocals than in the past."

Track listing

Personnel
Niki Eliot - bass, piano, vocals
Karen Hill - drums, piano
Jo Johnson - guitar, vocals
Chris Rowley - vocals, trumpet

References

1994 albums
Kill Rock Stars albums
Wiiija albums